Ulrike Poppe (original name Ulrike Wick; born 26 January 1953 in Rostock, GDR) was a member of the East German opposition. In 1982 she founded the "Women for Peace" network and in 1985 joined the Initiative for Peace and Human Rights. In 1989 she joined Democracy Now.

Poppe was a victim of the Stasi's  psychological warfare program.

In 1995 she was awarded the Order of Merit and in 2000 the Gustav Heinemann Prize.

Since 2001 she has been married  to Claus Offe.

External links
 Biography (in German) at Deutsches Historisches Museum
Andrew Curry: Piecing Together the Dark Legacy of East Germany's Secret Police Wired magazine 16.02, 18 January 2008

1953 births
Living people
People from Rostock
People from Bezirk Rostock
East German dissidents
East German women in politics
Recipients of the Cross of the Order of Merit of the Federal Republic of Germany